Avelumab, sold under the brand name Bavencio, is a fully human monoclonal antibody medication for the treatment of Merkel cell carcinoma, urothelial carcinoma, and renal cell carcinoma.

Common side effects include fatigue, musculoskeletal pain, diarrhea, nausea, infusion-related reactions, rash, decreased appetite and swelling of the limbs (peripheral edema).

Avelumab targets the protein programmed death-ligand 1 (PD-L1). It has received orphan drug designation by the European Medicines Agency (EMA) for the treatment of gastric cancer in January 2017. The US Food and Drug Administration (FDA) approved it in March 2017 for Merkel-cell carcinoma. an aggressive type of skin cancer. The EMA approved it in September 2017 for the same indication. This is the first FDA-approved treatment for metastatic MCC, a rare, aggressive form of skin cancer. Avelumab was developed by Merck KGaA and Pfizer.

Medical uses
In March 2017, the US Food and Drug Administration (FDA) granted accelerated approval to avelumab for the treatment of adults and children twelve years and older with metastatic Merkel-cell carcinoma (MCC).

In May 2017, the FDA approved avelumab for people with locally advanced or metastatic urothelial carcinoma whose disease progressed during or following platinum-containing chemotherapy or within twelve months of neoadjuvant or adjuvant platinum-containing chemotherapy.

In May 2019, the FDA approved avelumab in combination with axitinib for the first-line treatment of people with advanced renal cell carcinoma.

In June 2020, the FDA approved avelumab for the maintenance treatment of people with locally advanced or metastatic urothelial carcinoma that has not progressed with first-line platinum-containing chemotherapy.

Contraindications 
No contraindications have been specified.

Side effects 
The most common serious adverse reactions to avelumab are immune-mediated adverse reactions (pneumonitis, hepatitis, colitis, adrenal insufficiency, hypo- and hyperthyroidism, diabetes mellitus, and nephritis) and life-threatening infusion reactions. Among the 88 patients enrolled in the JAVELIN Merkel 200 trial, the most common adverse reactions were fatigue, musculoskeletal pain, diarrhea, nausea, infusion-related reaction, rash, decreased appetite, and peripheral edema. Serious adverse reactions that occurred in more than one patient in the trial were acute kidney injury, anemia, abdominal pain, ileus, asthenia, and cellulitis.

The most common serious risks are immune-mediated, where the body's immune system attacks healthy cells or organs, such as the lungs (pneumonitis), liver (hepatitis), colon (colitis), hormone-producing glands (endocrinopathies) and kidneys (nephritis). In addition, there is a risk of serious infusion-related reactions. Patients who experience severe or life-threatening infusion-related reactions should stop using avelumab. Women who are pregnant or breastfeeding should not take avelumab because it may cause harm to a developing fetus or a newborn baby.

Interactions 
As avelumab is an antibody, no pharmacokinetic interactions with other drugs are expected.

Pharmacology

Mechanism of action 
Avelumab is a whole monoclonal antibody of isotype IgG1 that binds to the programmed death-ligand 1 (PD-L1) and therefore inhibits binding to its receptor programmed cell death 1 (PD-1). Formation of a PD-1/PD-L1 receptor/ligand complex leads to inhibition of CD8+ T cells, and therefore inhibition of an immune reaction. Immunotherapy aims at ceasing this immune blockage by blocking those receptor ligand pairs. In the case of avelumab, the formation of PD-1/PDL1 ligand pairs is blocked and CD8+ T cell immune response should be increased. PD-1 itself has also been a target for immunotherapy. Therefore, avelumab belongs to the group of immune checkpoint blockade cancer therapies.

History 
As of May 2015, according to Merck KGaA and Pfizer, avelumab has been in Phase I clinical trials for bladder cancer, stomach cancer, head and neck cancer, mesothelioma, NSCLC, ovarian cancer and renal cancer. For Merkel-cell carcinoma, Phase II has been reached and for NSCLC there is also a study in Phase III.

In May 2017, avelumab was approved in the United States for the treatment of adults and children twelve years and older with metastatic Merkel cell carcinoma (MCC), including those who have not received prior chemotherapy. This is the first FDA-approved treatment for metastatic MCC, a rare, aggressive form of skin cancer.

Approval was based on data from an open-label, single-arm, multi-center clinical trial (JAVELIN Merkel 200 trial). All patients had histologically confirmed metastatic MCC with disease progression on or after chemotherapy administered for metastatic disease.

ORR was assessed by an independent review committee according to Response Evaluation Criteria in Solid Tumors (RECIST) 1.1. The overall response rate (ORR) was 33% (95% confidence interval [CI]: 23.3, 43.8), with 11% complete and 22% partial response rates. Among the 29 responding patients, the response duration ranged from 2.8 to 23.3+ months with 86% of responses durable for 6 months or longer. Responses were observed in patients regardless of PD-L1 tumor expression or presence of Merkel cell polyomavirus.

The approval of avelumab was based on data from a single-arm trial of 88 patients with metastatic MCC who had been previously treated with at least one prior chemotherapy regimen. The trial measured the percentage of patients who experienced complete or partial shrinkage of their tumors (overall response rate) and, for patients with a response, the length of time the tumor was controlled (duration of response). Of the 88 patients who received Bavencio in the trial, 33 percent experienced complete or partial shrinkage of their tumors. The response lasted for more than six months in 86 percent of responding patients and more than 12 months in 45 percent of responding patients.

The US Food and Drug Administration (FDA) granted the application for avelumab priority review, breakthrough therapy, and orphan drug designations.

The FDA granted accelerated approval of Bavencio to EMD Serono Inc.

In June 2020, avelumab was approved by the US Food and Drug Administration (FDA) for the indication of the maintenance treatment for people with locally advanced or metastatic urothelial carcinoma that has not progressed with first-line platinum-containing chemotherapy.

Efficacy of avelumab for maintenance treatment of urothelial carcinoma was investigated in the JAVELIN Bladder 100 trial (NCT02603432), a randomized, multi-center, open-label trial that enrolled 700 patients with unresectable, locally advanced or metastatic urothelial carcinoma that had not progressed with four to six cycles of first-line platinum-containing chemotherapy. Patients were randomized (1:1) to receive either avelumab intravenously every 2 weeks plus best supportive care (BSC) or BSC alone. Treatment was initiated within 4–10 weeks after last chemotherapy dose.

References

External links 
 

 

Breakthrough therapy
Merck brands
Monoclonal antibodies for tumors
Orphan drugs
Pfizer brands